Geraldine Morgan (born July 22, 1977) is a Chilean professional female bodybuilder.

Contest history

1998 National Fitness (Santiago, Chile)
1999 National Fitness (Viña del Mar, Chile)
2006 National Fitness Championship (Santiago, Chile)
2006 Fitness America Pageant (Hollywood, CA, US)
2008 IFBB Bodybuilding National Championship Copa Body Shop (Los Andes, Chile)
2008 IFBB South America Amateur Championship - 4th (HW) (São Paulo, Brazil)
2008 IFBB World Amateur Championships Santa Susana - 10th  (HW) (Barcelona, Spain)
2009 IFBB World Amateur Championships - 13th (HW) (Como, Italy)
2009 IFBB Arnold Classic Amateur - 3rd  (HW) (Columbus, OH, US)
2010 Musclemania America - 5th
2011 IFBB Arnold Classic Amateur - 2nd (HW) (Columbus, OH, US)
2011 IFBB Olympia Amateur & International Cup - 1st (London, England)
2012 IFBB Ms. International - 14th (Columbus, OH, US)
2013 IFBB Pro Bodybuilding Weekly Championships - 16th (Tampa, FL, US)
2016 IFBB Arctic Pro- 3rd (Alaska, US)

References

Further reading
"FLEX"
"Muscular Development"

External links
 Blog
 YouTube

1977 births
Chilean female bodybuilders
Living people
Professional bodybuilders